Andrew J. G. Kershaw (born 9 November 1959) is a broadcaster and disc jockey, predominantly on radio, and known for his interest in world music.

Kershaw's shows feature a mix of country, blues, reggae, folk music, African music, spoken word performances and a wide variety of other music from around the world.

Early life and education
Kershaw was born in Littleborough, Lancashire, on 9 November 1959. His older sister is broadcaster Liz Kershaw. A headmaster and headmistress, Kershaw's parents instilled in him the ethics of education and self-improvement at an early age.

As a party trick aged two, he would name the whiskered military men in his father's history books of the Great War, but he never felt the love or pride from his parents that he got from his grandparents, who provided a home from home.<ref name="autogenerated1">Kershaw, Andy. No Off Switch". Serpents Tail, 2011.</ref>

He was educated at Hulme Grammar School in Oldham where he took A-Levels in History, Economics and Spanish. He left the Economics examination halfway into the allotted time in order to attend a Bob Dylan concert but still achieved a Grade A pass in the subject. He then studied politics at the University of Leeds from which he failed to graduate, his decision to apply for a place there being solely with an eye on the position of Entertainments Secretary for Leeds University Union.

Kershaw was elected Entertainments Secretary in 1980, midway through his second year. A full-time commitment to a non-sabbatical office, he booked bands including Ian Dury, Dire Straits, the Clash, Elvis Costello, Iggy Pop and Duran Duran - the latter were paid £50 from Kershaw's own pocket to support Hazel O'Connor.

Life and career
Kershaw's first engagement after the University of Leeds was to oversee backstage operations of the Rolling Stones' epic 1982 Roundhay Park concert in Leeds.

Music broadcasting

Kershaw began work for Radio Aire as Promotions Manager, a position he used - with station presenter Martin Kelner - to ruthlessly promote the UK's third-largest town without city status, Northampton. Unintentionally, at Radio Aire, he helped to launch the media career of Carol Vorderman, and made his broadcasting debut, fronting a late night alternative show and a weekly blues programme. After being made redundant from Radio Aire in 1983, Kershaw was employed as a driver, tour manager and roadie by the singer Billy Bragg.

His big break came in 1984, when he was asked to present BBC TV's flagship rock programme, The Old Grey Whistle Test, by its producer Trevor Dann, whom Kershaw had met when filming with Bragg the previous week. He subsequently recorded a television interview with his hero Bob Dylan, and a loud session from the Ramones. He co-presented BBC television coverage of Live Aid in 1985. In July 1985, Kershaw began life as a BBC Radio 1 DJ, ear-marked by the station as a possible successor to John Peel.

Room 318 of Egton House was to house Kershaw, Peel and their mentor, producer John Walters, whose Reithian motto was, "We're not here to give the public what it wants. We're here to give the public what it didn't know it wanted." His weekly Radio 1 shows were characterised by their high levels of enthusiasm and musical eclecticism.

Kershaw's "boredom" with Anglo-American rock led him to seek out sounds from further afield, especially Africa. Fellow DJ Charlie Gillett introduced him to Stern's African Records shop in London, and Lucy Durán exposed him to musicians like Youssou N'Dour and Toumani Diabaté, playing impromptu sessions in her London front room. Peel and Kershaw discovered Zimbabwe's Bhundu Boys simultaneously; the band began to feature heavily on their playlists. The Bhundus' singer Biggie Tembo became Kershaw's great friend.

This first year of broadcasting won Kershaw his first gold Sony Award in 1987. Kershaw was the first to play Ali Farka Touré on mainstream national radio, and the documentary they made together in Mali was the first ever to be broadcast simultaneously on Radios 1 and 4.

Kershaw's contract with Radio 1 ended in 2000. His last months on the network featured sessions by Willie Nelson, Warren Zevon and Lou Reed. He then worked at BBC Radio 3 the following year, where he soon completed a musical tour of the so-called Axis of Evil: Iraq, North Korea and Iran.

From July 2007 Kershaw was absent from his BBC Radio 3 show for an extended period, returning in 2011 with Music Planet, co-hosted with Lucy Durán.

In September 2020 Kershaw returned on air on BBC Radio 3 presenting a two episode Sunday Feature 
The Kershaw Tapes.

Broadcast journalism
Kershaw has worked as a journalist for BBC Radio 4's From Our Own Correspondent, the Today programme and The World Tonight. He reported from the 1994 Rwanda's genocide, Angola's civil war in 1996, Sierra Leone in 2001 and repeatedly from Haiti. Kershaw covered the 2010 Red Shirt Revolution in Bangkok for The Independent.

In his 1998 documentary for Radio 1, Ghosts of Electricity, Kershaw tracked down and unmasked, 32 years after the event, the heckler who shouted "Judas!" at Bob Dylan in 1966. In June 2005 Kershaw criticised Bob Geldof over the choice of artists due to play at Live 8, which included few black performers and even fewer Africans. Kershaw has put together two compilations, Great Moments of Vinyl History (1988) and More Great Moments of Vinyl History (2004), which document his wide musical taste.

Writing
Kershaw's autobiography, No Off Switch, was published in July 2011 by Serpent's Tail and was praised by Stephen Fry among others. It received a negative review from Rachel Cooke in The Guardian, who says "He is always right, and those who disagree are always stupid".

Personal life
Kershaw had a 17-year relationship with Juliette Banner, with whom he has two children. They moved to the Isle of Man, where the relationship broke down; he repeatedly harassed her. In October 2007 he was convicted of breaching a restraining order which required him not to contact her, and of driving under the influence, and in January 2008, he was sentenced to three months' imprisonment for repeatedly violating this order. He was arrested a few days after his release, and at the end of that year he was given a six-month suspended sentence

A much-advertised BBC Radio 4 interview with him, On the Ropes, was cancelled the day before transmission in April 2009 "over fears it would impinge on the privacy of his former girlfriend and their children". In August 2010 he was due to return to working at the BBC.

Recognition
In July 2003, Kershaw was awarded an honorary doctorate of music by the University of East Anglia, and in 2005 he was similarly honoured by his old university, the University of Leeds.

In March 2007, Kershaw appeared on Desert Island Discs''.

References

External links
 
 
 Andy Kershaw on Desert Island Discs

1959 births
Living people
Alumni of the University of Leeds
BBC Radio 3 presenters
English radio DJs
People from Littleborough, Greater Manchester
People educated at Oldham Hulme Grammar School
BBC Radio 1 presenters
BBC television presenters
Record collectors
People convicted of stalking